Seymour River may refer to:
 Seymour River (Burrard Inlet), in the Vancouver area of British Columbia
 Seymour River (Shuswap Lake), in the Shuswap area of British Columbia
 Seymour River (Vermont), see List of rivers of Vermont